Go Back is a 2017 South Korean television series starring Son Ho-jun and Jang Na-ra. It premiered on October 13, 2017 and aired every Friday and Saturday at 23:00 (KST) on KBS2.

The series was based on the Naver webtoon series Do it one more time by Hong Seung-pyo (aka Miti) and Kim Hye-yeon (aka Gugu), which was first published online in 2016.

Plot
Choi Ban-do (Son Ho-jun) and Ma Jin-joo (Jang Na-ra) are both 38 years old and married with a little son. Both are struggling through daily lives that leave them exhausted and unhappy.  Ban-do is a pharmaceutical salesman who spends his days begging people to buy his medicines and his evenings either drinking with prospective clients or helping an arrogant and cruel hospital director, Park Hyun-suk (Im Ji-kyu), to hide the fact that he is cheating on his wealthy wife. Jin-joo is a housewife who raises their son while struggling to find meaning in her life and feels lonely and abandoned by Ban-do.  After coming to a breaking point in their relationship, Ban-do and Jin-joo wake up to find themselves as 20-year-old university students.  They don't know why they are there or how long they will stay so they decide to enjoy it and make different choices than they did the first time around.  These decisions impact their families and friends.

Cast

Main
Son Ho-jun as Choi Ban-do
 A pharmaceutical salesman and Ma Jin-joo's husband. He was a Civil Engineering department student at Hankook University. However, after he graduated and got married, he started working as a pharmaceutical salesman, begging doctors and directors to buy his products, even willing to spend more money for his clients at bar, do menial jobs, even be bullied by them. Furthermore, one of his cruel clients pays him to hide his younger nurse from his wife by using credit cards under his name, with various hotel and motel listed on the bill. One day, he felt exhausted from the cruel treatments from his client and consistent naggings from Jin-joo. He agreed to his wife's divorce plea and wishing that they never met each other.
Jang Na-ra as Ma Jin-joo
 A homemaker and Choi Ban-do's wife for more than 10 years. She was a History department student at Hankook University. She is used to being germophobic but after becoming a homemaker, her hygiene deteriorated to the extent of willing to eat her son's food that he can't bite, wearing stained outfits most of the time and becoming gluttonous, eating at a faster pace than usual people. At first, she was happy with the marriage but some years later she feels exhausted and unhappy with her situation of being a homemaker, wishing herself to have a better job and income. She also feels that Ban-do starts abandoning her in term of affection and finances, believing that he is a cheap person. After a misunderstanding at a night, she wishes to go back in time when she didn't meet him and file for a divorce against Ban-do while demanding alimony for her and her son, Seo-jin.

Supporting

People around Ban-do
Heo Jung-min as Ahn Jae-woo
Ban-do's classmate in the civil engineering department. He is a weakling and comic relief but tries to change due to his love for Yoon Bo Reum.
Lee Yi-kyung as Go Dok-jae 
Ban-do's classmate in the civil engineering department. A man with a bright and charming personality and long hair who is called naive and a little dumb. 
Go Bo-gyeol as Min Seo-young 
A ballet major whom Ban-do admired but was too shy to approach in the past 
Im Ji-kyu as Park Hyun-suk  
Ban-do's senior at university at Medicine department. In the present, he is the director of a hospital. A very cruel person, he used to use innocent look to cheat on his girlfriend (and in present, is his wife) that he loves only for her family's wealthy background to date a lot of women. He keeps doing his old habit in the present, seducing younger and prettier nurses even using Choi Ban-do's credit card name to hide his mistresses at hotels and motels. 
Lee Do-yeon as Kim Ye-Rim, girlfriend/wife of Park Hyun-suk in the past/present, who comes from a wealthy family.
Kim Byeong-ok as Choi Gi-il, Ban-do's father
Jo Ryun as Kang Kyung-sook, Ban-do's mother 
Go Eun-min as Choi Ja-yeon 
Ban-do's sister. She bullies her brother, but also stands up for him.

People around Jin-joo
Han Bo-reum as Yoon Bo-reum 
Jin-joo's best friend in university, now an aerobics instructor. A former university cheerleader with an easygoing personality and a high alcohol tolerance. 
Cho Hye-jung as Chun Seol 
Jin-joo's best friend in university. She has an innocent and goody-two-shoes appearance but can be an odd-ball with sarcastic remarks.
Jang Ki-yong as Jung Nam-gil 
A ROTC candidate and popular upperclassman in the same history department as Jin-joo. While all other university females fawn over him, he has a one-sided crush on Jin-joo. 
Lee Byung-joon as Ma Pan-suk, Jin-joo's father 
Kim Mi-kyung as Go Eun-sook, Jin-joo's mother, who has diabetes.  
Cha Min-ji as Ma Eun-joo, Jin-Joo's elder sister

Special appearance
Kim Hyun-mok as Broadcasting student
Yang Dae-hyuk as Senor of History Department
Seo Woo-jin as Cameo	
Jung Yun-ho
Lee Sang-min
Lee Hwi-jae
Yang Ji-won
Kim Ki-doo as Soldier (Ep.6)

Production
The drama, directed and written by the production team of The Sound of Your Heart, is the first production of Zium Content, the production company founded by ex-KBS drama producer Han Seok-won (Hwarang: The Poet Warrior Youth) in early 2017. It was co-produced by KBS N.

Original soundtrack

The soundtrack released on November 20, 2017 for the korean drama of the same name. The CD 1 composed of 7 tracks which was released as a single while the CD 2 released as a track on the album.

Part 1

Part 2

Part 3

Part 4

Part 5

Part 6

Part 7

CD 2

Chart performance

Album chart

Digital chart

Ratings 
 In this table, the blue numbers represent the lowest ratings and the red numbers represent the highest ratings.
 NR denotes that the drama did not rank in the Top 20 daily rankings.

Awards and nominations

References

External links
  
 
 
 

2017 South Korean television series debuts
Korean Broadcasting System television dramas
Korean-language television shows
South Korean romantic comedy television series
South Korean time travel television series
2017 South Korean television series endings
Television shows based on South Korean webtoons
Television series by Zium Content
Television series set in 1999
Television series set in 2017